Amir Nussbaum (born 9 October 1980) is a former Israeli footballer and now a manager.

External links
 

1980 births
Living people
Israeli footballers
Footballers from Rishon LeZion
Hapoel Rishon LeZion F.C. players
Beitar Tel Aviv Bat Yam F.C. players
Maccabi Kiryat Gat F.C. players
Hapoel Ironi Kiryat Shmona F.C. players
Hapoel Nir Ramat HaSharon F.C. players
Hapoel Haifa F.C. players
Hapoel Kfar Saba F.C. players
Liga Leumit players
Israeli Premier League players
Israeli football managers
Hapoel Petah Tikva F.C. managers
Beitar Tel Aviv Bat Yam F.C. managers
Hapoel Ironi Kiryat Shmona F.C. managers
Hapoel Rishon LeZion F.C. managers
F.C. Kafr Qasim managers
Israeli Premier League managers
Association football defenders